Gardenia barnesii is a species of plant in the family Rubiaceae native to the Philippines.

References

barnesii